Cardinal Wiseman Catholic School is a coeducational secondary school and sixth form situated in Potters Green, Coventry, England. It is part of the Romero Catholic Academy (Romeo MAC).

Feeder primary schools
Corpus Christi, Ernesford Grange
Good Shepherd, Courthouse Green
Sacred Heart, Stoke
St Gregory's, Wyken
St John Fisher, Wyken
St Patrick's, Wood End
SS Peter and Paul, Walsgrave
Coventry special needs schools

The Prince of Wales visit
Charles, Prince of Wales visited the school in April 2008. He was interested in the school's farm and how the pupils looked after the animals. The school won the DCSF Sustainable Schools Award in 2009. As of July 2017, the farm is now being shut down due to fewer pupils not choosing to participate in the animal care subjects as well as the new management's focus on academic subjects.

Malawi Links
Cardinal Wiseman School has been sending students to Malawi for over a decade and has established links with a number of schools, most notably Bunda School. Bunda is on track to becoming a sustainable school  and with, the help of Cardinal Wiseman staff, students and contributors to the Cardinal Wiseman Malawi Trust  hopes to become an advice hub for other schools in Malawi. The Trust has given much help and support to Bunda over the years and also to Kasina Health Clinic.

Notable former pupils
Jacquie Beltrao − represented Britain in gymnastics at the 1984 Olympics; currently a sports presenter on Sky News.
Luke McCormick − professional footballer
James Quinn − former professional footballer
Sharon Maguire − film director
Sinead Matthews − actress
James Collins − Republic of Ireland U21 footballer, currently playing at Luton Town FC, formerly of Hibernian FC, Aston Villa and Swindon Town
Craig Reid − footballer
Jordan Mackampa − musical artist
Emma McGann − singer-songwriter, musician, and online live-streamer

References

External links
Schoolsnet

Secondary schools in Coventry
Catholic secondary schools in the Archdiocese of Birmingham
Academies in Coventry